Vishwanath Prasad Tiwari (born 1940) is an Indian poet, editor, critic and a former president of the Sahitya Akademi who served to the post from 2013 to 2018. He has published around 50 books in Hindi on various genres such as criticism, poetry, travelogues, biographies, interviews besides editing books.

Biography 
He was born in 1940 in Gorakhpur, Uttar Pradesh. He obtained BA with Hindi from Gorkhapur University and MA and PhD in Hindi literature. He served as the head of the department and acharya for Hindi at Deen Dayal Upadhyay Gorakhpur University until he retired in 2001. After starting his writing career he published his first uncertain book in 1970.

His prominent work includes Saath Chalte Hue, Kavita Kya Hai (What is kavita), and Bistar Duniya Le Liye.

Awards

References 

1940 births
Living people
Hindi-language poets
Poets from Uttar Pradesh
Recipients of the Gangadhar National Award
Recipients of the Sahitya Akademi Fellowship
Deen Dayal Upadhyay Gorakhpur University alumni